South Adams Junior-Senior High School is a public high school located in Berne, Indiana, United States.

Athletics 
South Adams is currently a member of the Allen County Athletic Conference (ACAC). The following sports are offered at SA:

 Baseball (boys)
 State Runner-Up (1972)
 State Qualifier (1982)
 Basketball (boys & girls)
 Cross Country (co-ed)
 State Qualifier (2013)
 Football (boys)
 State Runner-Up (2020)
 Golf (boys & girls)
 Soccer (girls)
 Softball (girls)
 Swimming & Diving (boys & girls)
 Tennis (boys & girls)
 Track & Field (co-ed)
 Volleyball (girls)
 Wrestling (boys)

History 
The first school in Berne proper was a small two-story brick building, constructed in 1888 on the site of the current City Building. It was enlarged to six classrooms (with a Hall) in 1892, with further renovations in 1909 (making eight classrooms). Originally, the high school course lasted only two years. Later it was extended to three years and finally to four. The first Berne High School class graduated in 1901. This first school building remained in use until 1939, when the new second Berne High School building opened, in a different spot - on the grass lot across from the current Clocktower. This building was renamed "South Adams High School" after consolidation in 1966. Finally, due to the increased enrollment resulting from consolidation, in 1973 the current South Adams High School complex opened south of town. "South Adams" is a consolidation of four area high schools (and former rivals): Berne High School (1899-1966), Geneva High School (1894-1966), Hartford Township High School (1900-1963: "Linn Grove" until 1918), and Jefferson Township High School (1913-1956).

See also
 List of high schools in Indiana
 Allen County Athletic Conference

References

External links 
 Official website

Public high schools in Indiana
Schools in Adams County, Indiana